The list of Sunshine Coast Region suburbs includes a range of suburbs, localities, towns and rural districts in South East Queensland, Australia within the local government area of Sunshine Coast Region. On 1 January 2014, part of the region deamalgamated to re-establish the Shire of Noosa.

Urban centres
The Sunshine Coast contains a number of urban centres, each with a contiguous urban area and a central business district, which for planning and amenity purposes are maintained on separate plans by the Regional Council and treated as discrete sub-regions by the Australian Bureau of Statistics. They are:

 Caloundra Sub-Region
 Kawana Waters Sub-Region
 Maroochydore Sub-Region
 Buderim Sub-Region
 Coolum Sub-Region
 Nambour Sub-Region

Suburbs

Caloundra area

 Aroona
 Bald Knob
 Balmoral Ridge
 Battery Hill
 Beerburrum
 Beerwah
 Bells Creek
 Birtinya
 Bokarina
 Booroobin
 Bribie Island North
 Buddina
 Caloundra
 Caloundra West
 Cambroon
 Conondale
 Coochin Creek
 Crohamhurst
 Curramore
 Currimundi
 Diamond Valley
 Dicky Beach
 Elaman Creek
 Glass House Mountains
 Glenview
 Golden Beach
 Harper Creek
 Kings Beach
 Landsborough
 Little Mountain
 Maleny
 Meridan Plains
 Minyama
 Moffat Beach
 Mooloolah Valley
 Mount Mellum
 North Maleny
 Palmview
 Parrearra
 Peachester
 Pelican Waters
 Reesville
 Shelly Beach
 Warana
 Witta
 Wootha
 Wurtulla

Maroochy area

 Alexandra Headland
 Belli Park
 Bli Bli
 Bridges
 Buderim
 Burnside
 Chevallum
 Coes Creek
 Coolabine
 Cooloolabin
 Coolum Beach
 Cotton Tree
 Diddillibah
 Doonan
 Dulong
 Eerwah Vale
 Eudlo
 Eumundi
 Flaxton
 Forest Glen
 Gheerulla
 Highworth
 Hunchy
 Ilkley
 Image Flat
 Kenilworth
 Kiamba
 Kidaman Creek
 Kiels Mountain
 Kulangoor
 Kuluin
 Kunda Park
 Kureelpa
 Landers Shoot
 Mapleton
 Marcoola
 Maroochy River
 Maroochydore
 Mons
 Montville
 Mooloolaba
 Mount Coolum
 Mountain Creek
 Mudjimba
 Nambour
 Ninderry
 North Arm
 Obi Obi
 Pacific Paradise
 Palmwoods
 Parklands
 Peregian Beach
 Peregian Springs
 Perwillowen
 Point Arkwright
 Rosemount
 Sippy Downs
 Tanawha
 Towen Mountain
 Twin Waters
 Valdora
 Verrierdale
 West Woombye
 Weyba Downs
 Woombye
 Yandina Creek
 Yandina
 Yaroomba

Sunshine Coast